John Selby (born 1945) is the American author of over two dozen self-help, spiritual-growth, business-success and psychology books published in 14 languages, with half a million books in print, 
published during the last 35 years by New World Library, Warner Books, Bantam Books, Doubleday (publisher), Dell, Random House, Harper San Francisco, Droemer Knaur Verlag, DTV Verlag, Rowohlt Verlag, and Sterling Books.

Biography 
Selby was raised on cattle ranches in California and Arizona.
He attended Princeton University, UC Berkeley, and the Radix Institute.

Selby is currently married to Birgitta Steiner of Waldassen, Bavaria. They have 2 sons, Kibo and Jesse. John also has an earlier son, Shon, by another marriage. John and Birgitta lived in Europe for 5 years, Santa Barbara, California for 2 years, Kauai for 21 years, and in 2011 moved to Santa Cruz, California.

John's father Walter Smith was a musical inventor. Selby carried his father's ‘there must be a better way’ attitude into his psychological career by refining new therapy and meditation techniques. While based in Europe, Selby ran eight experimental test groups for four years duration, conducting 160 three-day experimental-technique seminars. He then published an extensive 'cassettebook' self-therapy series with Droemer Knaur Verlag and Bauer Media Group Verlag based on those studies. Later, eight of those original German-edition programs were later released as English-language books (see bibliography section).

Career 
Selby is an innovator in cognitive-shifting psychological techniques, having done mind-management research for NIH at the New Jersey Neuro-psychiatric Institute working under Dr. Humphrey Osmond MD. He also pioneered the development of and has apparently coined the term Focus phrase for inducing particular cognitive changes.

In the early 1980s Selby moved his operational base to West Berlin to guide further psychological studies with Manfred Henschell at the Free University of West Berlin on the emotional-healing techniques of Wilhelm Reich. During this period he initiated the use of self-help and meditation audio cassette-books in the German language, published by Droemer Knaur and Bauer Verlags.

Selby returned to the United States in the 1990s and co-founded the short lived BrightMind Network. A company that was not able to reach its full potential and dissolved after several months. 

Selby has also worked as an awareness-management consultant with companies such as CitiBank Europe, the Allianz Group, the American Airlines Pilots Association, and Senn-Delaney Leadership. His three corporate-training texts, Executive Genius, Take Charge Of Your Mind, and Listening With Empathy emerged as part of that corporate work.

In 2007 Selby launched BedRock Productions to produce a new series of awareness-training programs including his latest movie and book of the same name, Tapping the Source. focused on experiential video content using what he says is an advanced patent-pending video formula designed to encourage a meditative quiet-mind state of awareness using special visual and audio inputs. Through his company he has also produced many psychological-guidance DVDs and audio-training CDs. Selby has also appeared on over 60 radio-interview programs where he leads the audience through what he calls 'live-guidance' using his alertness/awareness programs.

Bibliography 

 Kundalini Awakening In Everyday Life (with Zachary Selig): Random House, NY, 1990
 Secrets Of A Good Night’s Sleep: Dell/Doubleday, NY, 1990
 Peak Sexual Experience: Warner Books, NY, 1992
 Seven Masters, One Path: HarperSF, San Francisco, 2005
 Jesus For The Rest Of Us: Hampton Roads, Charlottesville, VA, 2006
 Take Charge Of Your Mind: Hampton Roads, Charlottesville, VA, 2006
 Let Love Find You: Random House, NY, 2007
 Listening With Empathy: Hamtpon Roads, Charlottesville, VA, 2007
 Executive Genius: Career Press, Franklinn Lakes, NJ, 2008
 Quiet Your Mind: New World Library, Novato, CA, 2008
 Tapping The Source: Sterling Publishing, NY, 2010
 Expand This Moment: New World Library, Novato, CA, 2011

Video work 

 Tapping The Source: The Master Process:BedRock Productions; 2011; Kilauea HI
 Quiet Mind: Focused Meditations With John Selby: BedRock Productions; 2010; Kilauea HI
 Falling Asleep: Relief From Restless Nights: BedRock Productions; 2010; Kilauea HI
 Insight Dreaming: A Guide To Understanding Your Dreams: BedRock Productions; 2009; Kilauea HI

Achievements 
 Chief Psychological Consultant and Professional Host for the national training program developed by 3D ETC Inc in Detroit in 2009.
 Research into inducing natural sleep led to the book "Secrets Of A Good Night's Sleep" and DVD titled "Falling Asleep" which was presented by Suzanne Somers.
 Developed special "pain relief" and "relaxation/healing" Experiential Video programs for Hospice and hospital-room wellness TV programming.
 Developed core audio/video content for the ExamPerformance college-market program for students taking SATs etc.
 Has worked as trainer at the corporate level to introduce Focus Phrase methodologies for practical application.
 Collaborated with John Gray in developing audio-guidance CDs

See also
List of New Thought writers
New Age
New Thought
Self-help
Spirituality

References

External links
Tapping the Source Movie and Book
Huffington Post Blogs

Living people
American motivational writers
21st-century American psychologists
American self-help writers
American spiritual teachers
American spiritual writers
New Thought writers
New Age writers
1945 births
Princeton University alumni
University of California, Berkeley alumni
20th-century American psychologists